Christian Theoharous (born 6 December 1999) is an Australian professional footballer who plays for Australian A-League Men club Central Coast Mariners.

Early life
Christian's father, Andrew Theoharous played for Heidelberg in the National Soccer League, and captained the Bentleigh Greens after the demise of the NSL.

Theoharous is a Greek and Greek Cypriot descent; his father was born in Pegia, Cyprus while his mother was born in Australia to Greek-born parents. He also has an older sister, who is an accountant.

Club career

Melbourne Victory
On 27 February 2017, Theoharous signed with Melbourne Victory FC as a scholarship player, after having been part of the Victory's youth team since 2014.

Theoharous made his Victory debut in 2017 as an 83rd minute substitute for Daniel Georgievski in a 1–0 loss to Brisbane Roar. Theoharous scored his debut first team goal for the Victory against the Central Coast Mariners on 18 March 2018.

Despite becoming a regular first-team player in the 2017–18 season, he missed Victory's victorious Grand Final finish to the season after getting injured in the semi final.

Borussia Mönchengladbach
Borussia Mönchengladbach announced that he had signed for the club on their official website on 18 May 2018.

Theoharous was released by Borussia Mönchengladbach in June 2021.

Western United
On 1 November 2021, Theoharous joined Australian A-League Men club Western United on a two-year scholarship deal. The club and player agreed to a mutual termination of his contract on 17 January 2023.

Central Coast Mariners
In January 2023, after agreeing a mutual termination of his contract with Western United, Theoharous signed with Central Coast Mariners until the end of the season, with an extension option. Theoharous made his debut for the club at the first game since his signing, appearing off the substitute's bench against Wellington Phoenix.

References

External links

1999 births
Living people
Association football forwards
Australian soccer players
Australian people of Greek Cypriot descent
Melbourne Victory FC players
Borussia Mönchengladbach II players
Western United FC players
Central Coast Mariners FC players
A-League Men players
National Premier Leagues players
Australia under-20 international soccer players
Soccer players from Melbourne
Regionalliga players
Australian people of Greek descent
Australian expatriate sportspeople in Germany
Australian expatriate soccer players
Expatriate footballers in Germany